The Pudovkino Formation (Russian: Pudovkino Svita) is a Late Cretaceous (Campanian) geologic formation in Saratov Oblast of European Russia. Pterosaur fossils have been recovered from the marine marls of the formation.

Fossil content 
The following fossils have been reported from the formation:

 Pterosaurs
 Azhdarchidae indet.
 Bivalves
 Monticulina vesicularis
 Belemnites
 Belemnitella mucronata
 Kosmospirella cf. similis
 Echinoids
 Echinocorys sp.

See also 
 List of pterosaur-bearing stratigraphic units

References

Bibliography 
 

Geologic formations of Russia
Upper Cretaceous Series of Europe
Cretaceous Russia
Campanian Stage
Marl formations
Paleontology in Russia
Geology of European Russia